Romania competed at the 1928 Summer Olympics in Amsterdam, Netherlands. 21 athletes (19 men and 2 women) competed in 16 events across two sports (athletics and fencing).

Athletics

13 athletes (11 men and 2 women) competed for Romania in 11 athletic events.

Men - Track & road events

Men - Field events

Men - Combined events – Decathlon

Women - Field events

Fencing

Eight fencers, all men, represented Romania in 1928.

References

External links
Official Olympic Reports

Nations at the 1928 Summer Olympics
1928
1928 in Romanian sport